Dino Betti van der Noot (born 1936) is an Italian jazz composer.

Biography
Van der Noot was born in Rapallo. His mother and cousin were classical pianists. He studied at Scuola Musicale of Pavia, 1946–51; in 1959 studied privately in Milan and in the 1970s at Berklee College of Music In Italy, he led combos from 1957–1960, but was not active in music in the 1960s. He led an amateur big band from 1969–1972 and a professional big band in 1982 and in 1987 in New York City. He is chairman of B Communications, an advertising agency in Milan.

In his bands, he worked with Andrea Dulbecco, Ares Tavolazzi, Bill Evans, Bob Cunningham, Danny Gottlieb,   David Friedman, Donald Harrison, Hugo Heredia, Famoudou Don Moye, Franco Ambrosetti, Giancarlo Schiaffini, Gianluigi Trovesi, John Taylor, Jonathan Scully, Joyce Yuille, Luis Agudo, Paul Bley, Paul Motian, Sandro Cerino, Steve Swallow, Tiziano Tononi, and Vincenzo Zitello.

"His compositions are narratives rife with colour, ranging from the boldest hues to the most subtle and revealing a sensitive, inventive melodist and lapidarian master of orchestral skills."

Awards and honors
 Record of the Year, Musica Jazz Critics' Poll (1987, 1989, 2013, 2015)
 Record of the Year, Dischi Critics' Poll (1989)
 Record of the Decade, Musica and Dischi Critics' polls (1989)
 Jazz Composer of the Year, Musica Jazz Critics' Poll (2007, 2009)
 Record of the Year, Musica Jazz Critics' Poll, The Stuff Dreams Are Made On (2013)
 Record of the Year, Musica Jazz Critics' Poll, Notes Are But the Wind (2015);

Albums
 Basement Big Band, 1977
 A Midwinter Night's Dream, 1983
 Here Comes Springtime, 1985
 They Cannot Know, 1987
 A Chance for a Dance, 1987–88
 Space Blossoms, 1988–89
 Ithaca/Ithaki, 2003–05
 The Humming Cloud, 2007
 God Save the Earth, 2009
 September's New Moon, 2011
 The Stuff Dreams Are Made On, 2013
 Notes Are But Wind, 2015

Bibliography
 In the U.S.: Brown, Croan, Ira Gitler, Nat Hentoff, Iannapollo, Ilwood, Jeske, Art Lange, Murphy, Palmer, Pareles, Porter, Shepard, Tesser, Watrous, Whitehea
 In Italy: Aliperto, Barazzetta, Belgiojoso, Candini, Cane, Casalini, Cerchiari, Corbetta, Di Fronzo, Di Termini, Favot, Fayenz, Franchi, Franchini, Franco, Gatto, Giamatti Fubini, Gianolio, Gioacchini, Maletto, Mannucci, Parmeggiani, Paternoster, Poggio, Polillo, Pollacci, Pollastri, Sabelli, Schiozzi, Serra, Taormina, Viganò, Vita, Zaccagnini, Zanzi, Zorman
 In France: Berger, Bourdin, Quénum
 Musica Jazz – Gennaio 2010 - n. 1
 Corriere della Sera - 25 Ottobre 2009 - n. 253
 Il Sole 24 Ore – 22 Novembre 2009 - n. 322
 Corriere della Sera (magazine) - Luglio 2005
 Il Giornale – Giugno 2008
 Leonard Feather & Ira Gitler: The Biographical Encyclopedia of Jazz, Oxford University Press, New York, 1999, page 59.
 Compact - Juin 1989
 The Journal News - January 29, 1987
 Down Beat - February 1987
 Cadence - February 1987
 The New York Times - September 8, 1987
 Avvenire - 14 Novembre 1986
 The Boston Globe - November 13, 1986
 USA Today - December 19, 1986
 Jazz Hot - Avril 1984

References

External links
Dino Betti van Der Noot official website

Dino Betti van Der Noot at Jazzitalia

Living people
Italian jazz musicians
1936 births
People from Rapallo
Berklee College of Music alumni
Date of birth missing (living people)